Scinax karenanneae is a species of frog in the family Hylidae.
It is endemic to Colombia.
Its natural habitats are subtropical or tropical moist lowland forests, rivers, freshwater marshes, and intermittent freshwater marshes.
It is threatened by habitat loss.

References

karenanneae
Amphibians of Colombia
Amphibians described in 1993
Taxonomy articles created by Polbot